Resulköy is a village in Toroslar district  of Mersin Province, Turkey. (The capital of Toroslar district is in Greater Mersin.) At  it is situated in the lower slopes of Toros Mountains and just at the north of the Çukurova motorway. The population of Resulköy was 805  as of 2012. Scallion is the most important agricultural crop of the village.

References

Villages in Toroslar District